Rangiora is a former New Zealand parliamentary electorate, based on the town of Rangiora.

Population centres
The electorate is based on the town of Rangiora and the surrounding rural area, and is north of Christchurch in North Canterbury.

History
The electorate existed from 1963 when it replaced the Hurunui electorate to 1996, when with mixed-member proportional (MMP) representation it was absorbed into the new Waimakariri electorate.

The electorate is semi-rural and was represented by the National Party except for the 1972-1975 period. Derek Quigley was a National MP who was opposed to the interventionist policies of Muldoon's Third National Government. He resigned from Cabinet in 1982, and from Parliament in 1984.

Members of Parliament
Key

Election results

1987 election

1984 election

1981 election

1978 election

1975 election

1972 election

1969 election

1966 election

1963 election

Notes

References

Historical electorates of New Zealand
1963 establishments in New Zealand
1996 disestablishments in New Zealand
Rangiora